Julian Charles Rayner is a malaria researcher, and the Director of the Cambridge Institute for Medical Research, part of the University of Cambridge School of Clinical Medicine. He is also Director of Wellcome Connecting Science. He was previously a member of academic Faculty at the Wellcome Sanger Institute.

Julian Rayner became Director of CIMR in 2019.

Education 
Rayner completed his undergraduate studies in New Zealand, before undertaking his PhD at the University of Cambridge. His doctoral research investigated the sorting of membrane proteins in the yeast secretory pathway while based at the Medical Research Council (MRC)  Laboratory of Molecular Biology (LMB) in Cambridge.

Career and research
Rayner joined the Sanger Institute in 2008,and became a Senior Group Leader in 2013. In 2014 he was appointed as the Director of Connecting Science for the Wellcome Genome Campus.

In 2019, he joined the University of Cambridge, as the Director of the Cambridge Institute for Medical Research. He was also elected to the Chair of Cell Biology in the School of Clinical Medicine.

Rayner's research interests encompass the origins of Plasmodium parasites, and how their invasion of red blood cells cause all the symptoms of malaria. Working with collaborators such as Beatrice Hahn, he has demonstrated that Plasmodium falciparum is likely to have originated in gorillas, rather than chimpanzees or ancient humans. Together with colleagues at the Sanger Institute, Rayner has identified a key ligand which is essential for erythrocyte invasion by P. falciparum and therefore has significant anti-malarial potential.

Public engagement
In March 2011 Rayner took part in the Argon Zone of the science engagement activity I'm a Scientist, Get me out of here!, where he won £500 to put towards a science communication project. Rayner used the prize money to create compact disc versions of the interactive game Malaria Challenge and distributed copies freely to schools in the UK.

Honours and awards
In 2015 he was awarded CA Wright Memorial medal by the British Society for Parasitology.

References 

Living people
21st-century British biologists
British parasitologists
New Zealand biologists
Year of birth missing (living people)